The Indian Council of Agricultural Research had decided to celebrate the birthday (3 December) of the first Indian union agriculture minister (1946) and the first President of Independent India, Bharat Ratna, Dr. Rajendra Prasad as Agricultural Education Day in India. By this initiative, the ICAR aims to develop interest in agriculture and allied sciences among the school and college students and to choose 'agriculture' as their professional & research career or  engage themselves in farming as agrientrepreneurs.

References

Awareness days
Agriculture in India